Francisca Oboh-Ikuenobe is a geologist from Ubiaja in Esan South East Local Government Area of Edo State. She specialises in palynology and sedimentology, and is Professor of Geology in the Department of Geosciences and Geological and Petroleum Engineering, and Associate Dean of Academic Affairs in the College of Engineering and Computing, Missouri University of Science and Technology.

Early career

Oboh-Ikuenobe attended St. Maria Goretti Girls Grammar School Benin-city, Nigeria. She gained a first-class BSc in geology in 1983, after which she worked as a production geologist for Shell Petroleum Development Company of Nigeria in Lagos, and palynologist with Shell at their geological laboratory in Warri Delta State, before returning to graduate school for her MSc in applied geology in 1987, from the University of Ife Nigeria (now Obafemi Awolowo University). Following this she held position as an assistant lecturer at Ife University. She was awarded a Commonwealth Scholarship Commission Award for her doctorate at the Department of Earth Sciences, University of Cambridge (New Hall, now Murray Edwards College), which was awarded in 1991 with her thesis 'Palaeoenvironmental Reconstruction of the E2.0 Reservoir in the Kolo Creek Field, Niger Delta (Nigeria)'. She joined Missouri S&T, then Department of Geology and Geophysics in 1991 as an assistant professor in geology.

Professional career

In 1997 Oboh-Ikuenobe was appointed associate professor of geology, in 2005 full professor, and program head in geology and geophysics from 2006 to 2014. She was appointed interim department chair from January 2015 until July 2017. She is currently associate dean for academic affairs in the College of Engineering and Computing. In addition to her academic positions she has worked as Shipboard Sedimentologist on the Ocean Drilling Program (Leg 159 Eastern Equatorial Atlantic Transform Margin) January to February 1995. Amongst other offices she was president elect, president and past president of the AASP (The Palynological Society) from 2010 to 2013, member-at-large on the Geological Society of America Diversity in the Geosciences Committee from 2012 to 2015, director of the Association for Women Geoscientists Foundation, 2005–2008, an editorial board member of Palynology journal, 1995 to 2009, and Associate Editor of the Journal of African Earth Sciences since 2019. In 2010 and 2011 she was a workshop leader for 'On the Cutting Edge', a professional development program for current and prospective geoscience faculty members, supported by the National Association of Geoscience Teachers and funded by the National Science Foundation. Since 2013, she has been a member of the International Geoscience Programme (IGCP) Scientific Board (Global Change Group), which is under the umbrella of UNESCO/International Union of Geological Sciences. Oboh-Ikuenobe is an elected fellow of the Geological Society of America, American Association for the Advancement of Science, and The Paleontological Society.

Research

Her research falls under the categories of palynology and sedimentology, with the former including studies of pollen and other palynomorphs within sediments and sedimentary rocks as a proxy for biostratigraphic, palaeoecological and palaeoclimatic reconstructions. She also integrates palynofacies with organic geochemistry.

Selected publications
 Mathur, R., Mahan, B., Spencer, M., Godfrey, L., Landman, N., Garb, M., Pearson, G.D., Liu, S.-A., and Oboh-Ikuenobe, F.E., 2021. Fingerprinting the Cretaceous-Paleogene boundary impact with Zn isotopes. Nature Communications, 12:4128; https://doi.org/10.1038/s41467-021-24419-8.
 Romero, I.C., Kong, S., Fowlkes, C.C., Urban, M.A., Jaramillo, C., Oboh-Ikuenobe, F., D’Apolito, C., and Punyasena, S.W., 2020. Improving the taxonomy of fossil pollen using convolutional neural networks and superresolution microscopy. Proceedings of the National Academy of Sciences; www.pnas.org/cgi/doi/10.1073/pnas.2007324117.
 Oboh-Ikuenobe, F.E., Antolinez-Delgado, H., and Awad, W.K., 2017. Dinoflagellate cyst assemblages, biostratigraphy and paleoenvironment of a Paleocene-Early Eocene sedimentary succession in the northern Niger Delta Basin: Comparison with low, mid and high latitude regions. Palaeogeography, Palaeoclimatology, Palaeoecology, v. 481, p. 29-43; doi: 10.1016/j.palaeo.2017.05.020.
 Barron, A., Zobaa, M.K., and Oboh-Ikuenobe, F.E., 2017. Palynological evidence for sustained deep-marine conditions during the Eocene-Miocene in the southern Gulf of Mexico distal continental margin. Geological Society of America Bulletin, v. 129, p. 218-228; doi: 10.1130/B31559.1.
 Pletsch, T., Erbacher, J., Holbourne, A.E.L., Kuhnt, W., Moullade, M., Oboh-Ikuenobe, F.E., Söding, E., and Wagner, T., 2001. Cretaceous separation of Africa and South America: the view from the West African margin (ODP Leg 159). Journal of South American Earth Sciences, v. 14, p. 147-174.
 Jaramillo, C.A., and Oboh-Ikuenobe, F.E., 1999. Sequence stratigraphic interpretations from palynofacies, dinocyst and lithological data of Upper Eocene-Lower Oligocene strata in southern Mississippi and Alabama, U.S. Gulf Coast. Palaeogeography, Palaeoclimatology, Palaeoecology, v. 145, p. 259-302.
 Oboh, F.E., 1992. Middle Miocene palaeoenvironments of the Niger Delta. Palaeogeography, Palaeoclimatology, Palaeoecology, v. 92, p. 55-84.

Awards

 Women's Hall of Fame Inductee, Missouri University fo Science and Technology, 2022
 Elected Fellow, The Paleontological Society, 2020 
 Elected Fellow, American Association for the Advancement of Science (AAAS), 2017
 Elected Fellow, Geological Society of America (GSA), 2011
 Fulbright Specialist Roster Candidate, 2010–2015
 Elite American Educators, 2010–present
 Best Poster Award — XXIII Brazilian Congress of Paleontology, Gramado, 2013
 Woman of Legacy, Voices of Edo Women, 2011
 Science and Technology Award, Nigerian People's Forum— USA, 2008
 NSF Committee of Visitors, 2008
 SEPM Outstanding Journal Paper Award, Journal of Sedimentary Research 2007
 American Men and Women of Science, 1994–present

External links
• ORCiD https://orcid.org/0000-0002-2223-9691

References

Living people
Nigerian women scientists
Women earth scientists
American earth scientists
Nigerian scientists
Nigerian women academics
Alumni of New Hall, Cambridge
Year of birth missing (living people)
Academic staff of Obafemi Awolowo University
Obafemi Awolowo University alumni
Missouri University of Science and Technology faculty
Nigerian expatriate academics in the United States
20th-century American women scientists
21st-century American women scientists
American women academics